Milkwall railway station is a disused station on the former Severn and Wye Railway. It served the village of Milkwall, Gloucestershire, England. The station opened in 1875 and was closed only in 1929 due to lack of passenger use. The line remained in use for goods traffic until the line was closed from Parkend to Coleford.

Today the site of the station is now occupied by an engineering company and the trackbed is now a cycle track from Coleford to Parkend.

Services

External links
Milkwall Station, Gloucestershire in the 1920s
Milkwall on Railscot
Milkwall on Forest of Dean Railways

References

Disused railway stations in Gloucestershire